RFA Wave Master (A193) was a Wave-class fleet support tanker of the Royal Fleet Auxiliary.

She was built as Empire Salisbury by Sir J. Laing & Sons Ltd, and transferred to the Royal Fleet Auxiliary in 1946. She was laid up at Singapore on 23 September 1962, and scrapped at Jurong in May 1963.

References

Wave-class oilers
Tankers of the Royal Fleet Auxiliary
Ministry of War Transport ships
World War II merchant ships of the United Kingdom
1944 ships